Jalayer is an Arabic surname. Notable people with the surname include:

 Parviz Jalayer  (1939–2019), Iranian weightlifter 
Tahmasp Khan Jalayer, 18th-century Iranian military commander

Arabic-language surnames
Persian-language surnames